Gypsy Road is the fifth studio album by Canadian country music artist Dean Brody. It was released on April 21, 2015 via Open Road Recordings. The first single, "Upside Down", was released on February 9. The album's second single, "Bring Down the House", was released to Canadian country radio on May 25, 2015. The album's third single, "Love Would Be Enough", was released to Canadian country radio on October 23, 2015. The album's fourth single, "Monterey", was released to Canadian country radio on March 18, 2016.

Content
Two of the album's songs were previously recorded by other artists: "Hillbilly" by Billy Currington on his second studio album, Doin' Somethin' Right, and "As Country as She Gets" by Joe Nichols for his 2005 album, III.

Critical reception
Francois Marchand of The Vancouver Sun gave the album four and a half stars out of five, writing that "Gypsy Road is one of the finest Canadian country albums released in recent years and even if country ain’t really your thang, you should get a kick out of this one." Bruce Leperre of the Winnipeg Free Press gave the album four stars out of five, calling it Brody's "most satisfying offering yet."

Track listing

Chart performance
In its debut week, the album peaked at number seven on the Canadian Albums Chart, selling 2,700 copies.

Album

Singles

References

2015 albums
Dean Brody albums
Open Road Recordings albums
Juno Award for Country Album of the Year albums